Ben Thomas is a Welsh international lawn bowler.

Bowls career
Thomas is a four times National champion, winning the pairs in 2011, the fours in 2012 and 2013 and the singles in 2019 at the Welsh National Bowls Championships. He subsequently won a British title in 2014 after winning the fours at the British Isles Bowls Championships.

In 2019 he won the fours bronze medal at the Atlantic Bowls Championships

References

Welsh male bowls players
Living people
Year of birth missing (living people)